These are the official results of the Men's Shot Put event at the 1991 IAAF World Championships in Tokyo, Japan. There were a total number of 23 participating athletes, with the final held on Saturday August 31, 1991. Werner Günthör of Switzerland won the competition with a throw of 21.67 metres.

The original silver medallist, Georg Andersen of Norway, was disqualified and stripped of his medal after testing positive for anabolic steroids. The original bronze medallist (Lars Arvid Nilsen) was elevated to the silver while the fourth-placed Soviet thrower Aleksandr Klimenko received the bronze instead.

Medalists

Schedule
All times are Japan Standard Time (UTC+9)

Abbreviations
All results shown are in metres

Records

Qualification

Final

See also
 1990 Men's European Championships Shot Put (Split)
 1991 Shot Put Year Ranking
 1992 Men's Olympic Shot Put (Barcelona)

References

 Results

s
Shot put at the World Athletics Championships